Dove  is a given name in the English language. The name is derived from the English vocabulary word "dove". This is word is in turn derived from the Old English douve, from the Old Norse döfa. The dove is noted as a symbol of peace. The name was coined in modern times.

People with the name
Although the name Dove would normally be expected to be feminine, the best known examples of its use are actually as a name adopted by males:
 Dove Gregory, born Gregory Dove, (1837–1873), English cricketer
 Dove-Myer Robinson, born Mayer Dove Robinson, (1901–1989), New Zealand mayor
 Dove Cameron, born Chloe Hosterman, (1996-present), American actress and singer
 Dove Attia, producer

References

English-language feminine given names
Given names derived from birds